Yunfu Cantonese or Yunfu vernacular is a dialect of Yue Chinese spoken in Yunfu, Guangdong, China. It is classified as a variety of Yuehai Yue, or in more recent classification, Guangfu Yue.

Phonology
This section is mostly based on the variety spoken in Yuncheng.

Initials
The inventory of initials consists of 20 consonants (including the null initial):

Tones
Traditional accounts consider there to be eight tone categories:

Notes

References
 
 
 
 

Varieties of Chinese
Yue Chinese